Raymond W. Gibbs Jr. is a former psychology professor and researcher at the University of California, Santa Cruz. His research interests are in the fields of experimental psycholinguistics and cognitive science. His work concerns a range of theoretical issues, ranging from questions about the role of embodied experience in thought and language, to looking at people's use and understanding of figurative language (e.g., metaphor, irony, idioms). Raymond Gibbs's research is especially focused on bodily experience and linguistic meaning. Much of his research is motivated by theories of meaning in philosophy, linguistics, and comparative literature.

Education 

Gibbs received his Bachelor of Arts in Cognitive Science from Hampshire College in 1976. Then he went on to study at the University of California, San Diego and received his master's degree in Experimental Psychology in 1978, and his Ph.D. in Cognitive Psychology and Psycholinguistics in 1980.

Professional positions 

  (1991–1995) Chair, Department of Psychology, University of California, Santa Cruz
  (2013–2017) Distinguished Professor of Psychology, University of California, Santa Cruz 
  (1990–2013) Professor of Psychology, University of California, Santa Cruz
  (1986–1990) Associate Professor of Psychology, University of California, Santa Cruz 
  (1982–1986) Assistant Professor of Psychology, University of California, Santa Cruz 
  (1981–1982) Postdoctoral Fellow in Cognitive Science, Stanford University 
  (1980–1981) Postdoctoral Research Associate in Cognitive Science, Yale University

Services 

 Former Editor of Metaphor and Symbol (2001–2018)
 Associate Editor of the Journal of Mental Imagery

Current member of editorial boards for these scholarly journals 

 Cognitive Linguistics
 Discourse Processes
 Journal of Pragmatics
 Intercultural Pragmatics
 Psychologia
 Poetics
 International Journal of Cognitive Linguistics
 Pragmatics and Society
 Metaphor in the Social World
 Scientific Study of Literature
 Israeli Journal of Humor Research
 Lodz Papers in Pragmatics

Editorial boards for book series 

 Human Cognitive Processing (Benjamins)
 Linguistic Approaches to Literature (Benjamins) 
 Mouton Series in Pragmatics (Mouton) 
 Cognitive Linguistic Studies of Language Cognition in Cultural Contexts (Benjamins) 
 Metaphor in Language
 Cognition, and Communication (Benjamins) 
 Topics in Humor Research (Benjamins)

Previous services 

 Senior Editor for Cognitive Science
 Editorial board member for Journal of Memory and Language
 Co-editor of book series: Human Cognitive Processing (Benjamins)

Research

Embodied experience in thought and language

One of Gibbs' main focuses of his research is on embodiment. His 2006 book Embodiment and Cognitive Science provides a large body of evidence to support the embodiment premise. This concept of embodiment "refers to understanding the role of an agent's own body in its everyday, situated cognition". Gibbs promotes a dynamic framework of embodiment that differs from the more traditional reductionist model of cognition. Gibbs says that embodiment refers not only to neural events but also to cognitive unconscious and to phenomenological experience. Gibbs discusses the relationship between body and consciousness from many different viewpoints and talks about the epistemological opposition between realism and idealism.

What's the difference between "embodied metaphor" and "abstraction from experience"? Gibbs' claim that abstract concepts arise by metaphor from embodied reality is sometimes hard to distinguish from the traditional empiricist view. For the most part same evidence can be used to support both views. Gibbs admits that the metaphor, which forms an abstract concept, does not preserve all aspects of the original bodily experience; so abstraction from experience might be a better term. The real originality of the embodied metaphor view is the claim that something of the embodied nature of the original experience still operates whenever an abstract concept is used. Gibbs states that the original experience persists in a schematic form called an image schema. He defines image schemas as analog representations of spatial relations and movements in space. For example, Gibbs lists a number of bodily experiences of the form "Some part of the body is too hot/cold/etc.": My head is too hot My hand is too cold My mouth feels too dry. He states that these are all instances of a single image schema, the balance schema. This image schema is claimed to be used in many kinds of abstract thought. For instance, in Hamlet's speech "To be or not to be", Gibbs says that "one quickly recognizes" is an allusion to the balance schema because it involves making a difficult decision.

More recently Gibbs conducted an experiment in order to examine people's embodied understanding of metaphorical narratives. Participants listened to one of two different, but similar stories about a relationship. One of the stories consisted of a successful relationship and the other did not. The stories were also described in metaphorical terms "your relationship was moving along in a good direction" or not such as "your relationship was very important to you." Participants were then blindfolded and asked to accurately walk, or imagine walking, to a marker a distance away while they thought about the story they just heard. Participants who heard about the successful metaphorical story walked longer and further than those presented with the unsuccessful relationship story. These walking and imagining differences disappeared when the metaphorical statement "moving along in a good direction" was replaced by a nonmetaphorical expression. This experiment that Gibbs set up suggests that people's understanding of metaphorical narratives is partly based on their embodied simulations of the metaphorical actions referred to in speech.

Gibbs and Marlene Johansson Falck, in order to help solidify his position on embodiment of metaphorical meanings also used other studies to help show this. The results of two specific studies of his demonstrate how bodily experiences with real world items partly constrains not only how specific metaphors emerge, but also how different metaphorical understandings are applied in speech about abstract entities. The first of these two studies was on people's imagery for both "paths" and "roads". By asking participants to imagine themselves being on a path or being on a road and then asking them questions about their mental image such as is it likely that there will be obstacles along your way? Or is it likely to be paved? You can see that people give different answers to these questions depending on whether they were asked to imagine being on a road or being on a path. This was done so that it could be determined what types of properties are associated with each paths and roads. The results of this study found that most people think of paths as being more problematic to travel on, more aimless in their direction, something that stops are more frequent on, and most likely traveled on by foot as opposed to a vehicle of some sort. Roads were found to be thought of as complete opposite, such as they are viewed as straight, wide, paved, and have a specific destination that they lead too. Gibbs states that these shows that people understanding of paths and roads leans more towards the central aspects of their bodily actions. The second study that they used looked at the metaphorical functions of both the words "path" and "road" in speech. They found that when people use these words metaphorically it is linked to their embodied understanding of these words. For example, "Instead of introducing procedures which can be relied upon to identify and protect all those at risk of human rights violations in their own country, Government has introduced a range of measures which create obstacles in the path of those seeking asylum in the UK." The word path is used in this sentence in because there are obstacles in the way of those seeking asylum in the UK. And an example of how embodied understanding of a road affects how it is used metaphorically would be in this sentence; "But West Germany, always cautious about monetary union, has shrugged aside attempts by the Italians to bring forward by several months the start of the inter-governmental conference that will discuss the road to EMU."

Looking at use and understanding of figurative language

Metaphors

Gibbs does most of his research working with metaphor and how people understand and use them in speech. Linguistic metaphors, such as resemblance metaphors which are in the form of  "A is B" are seen as expressing common characteristics between the A and the B in the form "A is B". For example, "lawyers are sharks" is not meant to be taking literally as lawyers are predatory fish that live in the ocean. But as a way to infer that lawyers and sharks share the same qualities such as aggressiveness, and ceaseless effort to attain their goals with little regard to others in their path. But these metaphorical statements can do more than just assert a meaning. Gibbs says that they can also strengthen already existing assumptions about lawyers and therefore can be used in a social pragmatic way. Gibbs conducted a couple experiments in order to examine whether people inferred different pragmatic message when reading both metaphors and non-metaphors, the speed in which they could understand them. And also in comparing the effort needed to infer pragmatic messages between the two types. The first experiment was aimed to find out if could infer different pragmatic messages form metaphorical phrases. Gibbs found that in general, people understand not only the metaphorical meanings of the statements, but that they also can have different pragmatic implications for different contexts. He then did the same thing but this time without metaphorical phrases and found that pragmatic messages associated with understand non-metaphors is about the same as those associated with interpreting metaphors.

Gibbs also did some research on XYZ metaphors and how people interpret and explain them. He found that there are many different ways in which people are able to do this. Gibbs names several theoretical perspectives that could explain the different aspects of the data that they collected. Such as conceptual blending theory, conceptual metaphor theory, and  relevance theory. A comparison view says that people begin processing a metaphor by first lining up the representations of both the source and the target concepts. He also mentions that there is an alternative view that claims metaphors are understood better when using class-inclusion categorization processes instead of comparison statement. Gibbs mentions that it is not yet clear to present a theories that is better than the others to explain his interpretive results. However he does say that it is clear that "any future theoretical proposal on XYZ metaphors must deal with the complexity of people's interpretations, and not simply assume that all XYZ metaphors express the same type of meaning at the same level of detail."

Irony

Gibbs argues with the common assumptions that irony is a deliberate pragmatic action. He says that ironic acts may not be as "deliberate" in their creation and use as it is often said they are. He especially thinks this in the sense that ironic meanings arise from completely conscious states of mind. Gibbs proposes a dynamical view of intentional action that explains more thoroughly the psychological complexities of how ironic acts are created and understood. There are many different types of irony but ironic speech is very much a deliberate way to communicate. Speakers chose to use these ironic statements for a variety of social reasons. Gibbs however, says that there are cases in which a speaker's speech is understood as ironic even though there is clear recognition that the comment was not meant to be taken in that manner.  An example Gibbs' uses to show this is if two students were cheating on an exam together and than afterwards one of them says "I would never be involved in any cheating." This is clearly meant to be ironic to both the speaker and the listener. However, if you take just a slightly different story such as two students were taking a test and one of them copied off of the other without their knowledge. Than after the test someone asked the person who didn't know he was copied off of, "do you cheat?" he answered, "I would never be involved in any cheating."  Now this sentence was not meant to be ironic, however the student that cheated off of him may take this as ironic even though it was not intended to be. Gibbs uses this to show how unintentional irony is not an unusual phenomenon and that we as humans are quite capable to interpret these phrases and events as ironic without needing to contemplate the original deliberate intent of the person or people the speech or acts originated from.

Idioms

Gibbs does some research into idioms in conversation and how people understand and interpret them. In order to investigate people's comprehension of idioms that can have both a literal meaning and also an idiomatic meaning, Gibbs conducted an experiment where he had participants read stories one line at a time and the very last line in the story was an idiomatic expression. After the subject was finished reading that sentence they were asked to paraphrase it. Gibbs recorded the time it took participants to paraphrase these idiomatic expressions. He then did this same procedure except omitted the story and just had the participants read the idiomatic expression, this time he noticed that more incorrect understanding of the meaning of the idiom was occurring when there was no context. In conjunction with the times that were recorded and the frequency of errors in each given group Gibbs concluded that, "While idiomatic expressions are more familiar, literal interpretations of these expressions are better recalled. In other words, under normal circumstances of conversation, people remember unconventional uses of idioms better than conventional uses."

Publications

Books and edited collections 

 Gibbs, R. (1994). The poetics of mind: Figurative thought, language, and understanding. New York: Cambridge University Press. (also translated into Italian, Korean, Spanish, and Japanese).
 Gibbs, R. (1999). Intentions in the experience of meaning. New York: Cambridge University Press.
 Gibbs, R. (2006). Embodiment and cognitive science. New York: Cambridge University Press. (also translated into Portuguese).
 Gibbs, R., & Colston, H. (2012). Interpreting figurative meaning. New York: Cambridge University Press.
 Katz, A., Cacciari, C., Gibbs, R., & Turner, M. (1998). Figurative language and thought. New York: Oxford University Press.
 Gibbs, R. (Ed.) (2008). Cambridge handbook of metaphor and thought. New York: Cambridge University Press.
 Gibbs, R., & Steen, G. (Eds.). (1999). Metaphor in cognitive linguistics. Amsterdam: Benjamins.
 Gibbs, R., & Colston, H. (Eds.) (2007). Irony in language and thought: A cognitive science reader. New York: Erlbaum.
 Gibbs, R., & Gerrig, R. (Eds.) (1989). Special invited issue: Context and metaphor comprehension. Metaphor and Symbolic Activity, 3, 123–201.

Journal articles 

 Gibbs, R. (1979). "Contextual effects in understanding indirect requests". Discourse Processes, 2, 1–10.
 Gibbs, R. (1980). "Spilling the beans on understanding and memory for idioms in conversation". Memory & Cognition, 8, 149–156.
 Gibbs, R., & Tenney, Y. (1980). "The concept of scripts in understanding stories". Journal of Psycholinguistic Research, 9, 275–284.
 Gibbs, R. (1981). "Your wish is my command: Convention and context in interpreting indirect requests". Journal of Verbal Learning and Verbal Behavior, 20, 431–444.
 Gibbs, R. (1981). "Memory for requests in conversation". Journal of Verbal Learning and Verbal Behavior, 20, 630–640.
 Goodman, G., McClelland, J., & Gibbs, R. (1981). "The role of syntactic context in word recognition". Memory & Cognition, 9, 580–586.
 Gibbs, R. (1982). "A critical examination of the contribution of literal meaning to understanding nonliteral discourse". Text, 2, 9–27.
 Gibbs, R. (1983). "Do people always process the literal meanings of indirect requests?" Journal of Experimental Psychology: Learning, Memory, and Cognition, 9, 524–533.
 Gibbs, R. (1984). "Literal meaning and psychological theory". Cognitive Science, 8, 275–304.
 Gibbs, R. (1985). "On the process of understanding idioms". Journal of Psycholinguistic Research, 14, 465–472.
 Gibbs, R. & Gonzales, G. (1985). "Syntactic frozenness in processing and remembering idioms". Cognition, 20, 243–259.
 Gibbs, R., & Nagaoka, A. (1985). "Getting the hang of American slang: Studies on understanding and remembering slang metaphors". Language and Speech, 28, 177–195.
 Gibbs, R. (1986). "On the psycholinguistics of sarcasm". Journal of Experimental Psychology: General, 115, 3–15. Reprinted In R. Gibbs & H. Colston (Eds.), Irony in language and thought: A cognitive science reader. Mahwah, N.J.: Erlbaum.
 Gibbs, R. (1986). "Comprehension and memory for nonliteral utterances: The problem of sarcastic indirect requests". Acta Psychologica, 53, 41–57.
 Gibbs, R. (1986). "What makes some indirect speech acts conventional?" Journal of Memory and Language, 25, 181–196.
 Gibbs, R. (1986). "Skating on thin ice: Literal meaning and understanding idioms in conversation". Discourse Processes, 7, 17–30.
 Gibbs, R. (1987). "Memory for requests in conversation revisited". American Journal of Psychology, 100, 179–191.
 Gibbs, R. (1987). "Linguistic factors in children's understanding of idioms". Journal of Child Language, 12, 569–586.
 Gibbs, R., & Delaney, S. (1987). "Pragmatic factors in making and understanding promises". Discourse Processes, 8, 107–126.
 Gibbs, R. (1987). "Mutual knowledge and the psychology of conversational inference". Journal of Pragmatics, 13, 561–588.
 Mueller, R., & Gibbs, R. (1987). "Processing idioms with multiple meanings". Journal of Psycholinguistic Research, 16, 63–81.
 Gibbs, R. (1988). "The relevance of 'Relevance' for psychological theory". Behavioral and Brain Sciences, 9. 251–252.
 Gibbs, R., & Mueller, R. (1988). "Conversational sequences and preference for indirect speech acts Discourse Processes, 11, 101–116.
 Gibbs, R., Mueller, R., & Cox, R. (1988). "Common ground in asking and understanding questions". Language and Speech, 31, 321–335.
 Gerrig, R., & Gibbs, R. (1988). "Beyond the lexicon: Creativity in language production". Metaphor and Symbolic Activity, 3, 1–19.
 Gibbs, R. (1989). "Understanding and literal meaning". Cognitive Science, 13, 243–251.
 Gibbs, R. (1989). "How do you know when you have understood?: Psycholinguistics criteria for understanding verbal communication". Communication & Cognition, 10, 343–377. 
 Gibbs, R., & Gerrig, R. (1989). "How context makes metaphor comprehension seem special". Metaphor and Symbolic Activity, 4, 145–158. 
 Gibbs, R., & Nayak, N. (1989). "Psycholinguistic studies on the syntactic behavior of idioms". Cognitive Psychology, 21, 100–138. 
 Gibbs, R., Nayak, N., Bolton, J., & Keppel, M. (1989). "Speakers' assumptions about the lexical flexibility of idioms". Memory & Cognition, 16, 58–68.
 Gibbs, R., Nayak, N., & Cutting, C. (1989). "How to kick the bucket and not decompose: Analyzability and idiom processing". Journal of Memory and Language, 28, 576–593.
 Gibbs, R. (1990). "The process of understanding literary metaphor". Journal of Literary Semantics, 19, 65–94.
 Gibbs, R. (1990). "Comprehending figurative referential descriptions". Journal of Experimental Psychology: Learning, Memory, and Cognition 16, 56–66.
 Gibbs, R. (1990). "Psycholinguistic studies on the conceptual basis of idiomaticity". Cognitive Linguistics, 1, 417–451.
 Gibbs, R., & McCarrell, N. (1990). "Why boys will be boys and girls will be girls: Understanding colloquial tautologies". Journal of Psycholinguistic Research, 19, 125–145.
 Gibbs, R., & O'Brien, J. (1990). "Idioms and mental imagery: The metaphorical motivation for idiomatic meaning". Cognition, 36, 35–68. 
 Mueller, R., & Gibbs, R. (1990). "Inferring the interpretation of attributive and referential definite descriptions Discourse Processes, 14, 107–131. 
 Nayak, N., & Gibbs, R. (1990). "Conceptual knowledge in the interpretation of idioms". Journal of Experimental Psychology: General, 119, 315–330. 
 Gibbs, R. (1991). "Metaphor as constraint on individual creativity". Creativity Research Journal, 4, 85–88. 
 Gibbs, R. (1991). "Semantic analyzability in children's understanding of idioms". Journal of Speech and Hearing Research,, 34, 613–620. 
 Gibbs, R., Kushner, J., & Mills, R. (1991). "Authorial intentions and metaphor comprehension". Journal of Psycholinguistic Research, 20, 11–30. 
 Gibbs, R., & Nayak, N. (1991). "Why idioms mean what they do". Journal of Experimental Psychology: General, 120, 93–95. 
 Gibbs, R. (1992). "Metaphor, mental imagery, and dream cognition". Journal of Mental Imagery, 16, 103–108.
 Gibbs, R. (1992). "When is metaphor?: The idea of understanding in theories of metaphor". Poetics Today, 13, 575–606. 
 Gibbs, R. (1992). "What do idioms really mean?" Journal of Memory and Language, 31, 485–506. 
 Gibbs, R. (1992). "Categorization and metaphor understanding". Psychological Review, 99, 572–577. 
 Gibbs, R., & O'Brien, J. (1992). "Psychological aspects of irony understanding". Journal of Pragmatics, 18, 523–530. 
 Gibbs, R. (1993). "The intentionalist controversy and cognitive science". Philosophical Psychology, 6, 175–199. 
 Gibbs, R., Buchalter, D., Moise, J., & Farrar, W. (1993). "Literal meaning and figurative language". Discourse Processes, 16, 387–403.
 Gibbs, R., Beitel, D., Harrington, M., & Sanders, P. (1994). "Taking a stand on the meanings of stand: Bodily experience as motivation for polysemy". Journal of Semantics, 11, 231–251.
 Gibbs, R., & Kearney, L. (1994). "When parting is such sweet sorrow: The comprehension and appreciation of oxymora". Journal of Psycholinguistic Research, 23, 75–89. 
 Gibbs, R., & Beitel, D. (1995). "What proverb understanding reveals about how people think? Psychological Bulletin, 118, 133–154. Reprinted in (2003) Cognition, comprehension and communication: A decade of North American proverb studies. W. Mieder (Ed.), Eissen: Schneider Verlag.
 Gibbs, R., O'Brien, J., & Doolittle, S. (1995). "Inferring meanings that are not intended: Speakers' intentions and irony comprehension". Discourse Processes, 20, 187–203. 
 Gibbs, R., & Colston, H. (1995). "The cognitive psychological reality of image schemas and their transformations". Cognitive Linguistics, 6, 347–378. Reprinted in (2006) Cognitive linguistics: Basic readings. D. Geeraerts (Ed.). "Berlin: Mouton:
 Gibbs, R. (1996). "Why many concepts are metaphorical". Cognition, 61, 309–319.
 Gibbs, R., Colston, H., & Johnson, M. (1996). "Proverbs and the metaphorical mind". Metaphor and Symbolic Activity, 11, 207–216.
 Gibbs, R., Johnson, M., & Colston, M. (1996). "How to study proverb understanding". Metaphor and Symbolic Activity, 11, 233–239.
 Kishner, J., & Gibbs, R. (1996). "How 'just' gets its meanings: Polysemy and pragmatics in psychological semantics". Language and Speech, 39, 19–36.
 Gibbs, R., & Moise, J. (1997). "Pragmatics in understanding what is said". Cognition, 62, 51–74.
 Gibbs, R., Bogdonovich, J., Sykes, J., & Barr, D. (1997). "Metaphor in idiom comprehension". Journal of Memory and Language, 37, 141–154.
 Pfaff, K., Gibbs, R., & Johnson, M. (1997). "Metaphor in using and understanding euphemisms and dysphemisms". Applied Psycholinguistics, 18, 59–83.
 Gibbs, R., Strom, L., & Spivey-Knowlton, M. (1997). "Conceptual metaphor in mental imagery for proverbs". Journal of Mental Imagery, 21, 83–110.
 Pfaff, K., & Gibbs, R. (1997). "Authorial intentions in understanding satirical texts". Poetics, 25, 45–70.
 Gibbs, R. (1998). "Cognitive science meets metaphor and metaphysics". Minds & Machines, 8, 433–436.
 Colston, H., & Gibbs, R. (1998). "Analogy and irony: Rebuttal to 'rebuttal analogy'". Metaphor and Symbol, 13, 69–76.
 Gibbs, R. (1999). "Speakers' intuitions and pragmatic theory". Cognition, 69, 355–359. 
 Gibbs, R. (1999). "Inferring what speakers say and implicate". Brain & Language, 68, 466–485. 
 Gibbs, R., & Berg, E. (1999). "Embodied metaphor and perceptual symbols". Behavioral and Brain Sciences, 22, 617–618. 
 Gibbs, R., & Bogdonovich, J. (1999). "Mental imagery in interpreting poetic metaphor". Metaphor and Symbol, 14, 37–44. 
 Gibbs, R., & Matlock, T. (1999). "Psycholinguistics and mental representation: A comment". Cognitive Linguistics, 10, 263–269.
 Hamblin, J., & Gibbs, R. (1999). "Why you can't kick the bucket as you slowly die: Verbs in idiom understanding". Journal of Psycholinguistic Research, 39, 25–39.
 Gibbs, R. (2000). "Irony in talk among friends". Metaphor and Symbol, 15, 5–27. Reprinted In R. Gibbs & H. Colston (Eds.), Irony in language and thought: A cognitive science reader. Mahwah, N.J.: Erlbaum. 
 Gibbs, R. (2000). "Making good psychology out of blending theory". Cognitive Linguistics, 11, 347–358. 
 Leggitt, J., & Gibbs, R. (2000). "Emotional reactions to verbal irony". Discourse Processes, 29, 1–24. 
 Gibbs, R. (2001). "Evaluating contemporary models of figurative language understanding". Metaphor and Symbol, 16, 317–333. 
 Gibbs, R. (2001). "Authorial intentions in text understanding". Discourse Processes, 32, 73–80.
 Gibbs, R. (2001). "Proverbial themes we live by". Poetics, 29, 167–188.
 Gibbs, R., & Van Orden, G. (2001). "Mental causation and psychological theory". Human Development, 44, 368–374.
 Lima, P., Gibbs, R., & Francuzo, E. (2001). "Emergencia e natureza da metaphora primaria: Desejar e ter fome". Cadernos de Estudos Linguisticos, 40, 107–140.
 Matlock, T., & Gibbs, R. (2001). "Conceptual knowledge and polysemy: Psycholinguistic studies on the meanings of make". Communication & Cognition, 34, 231–256.
 Colston, H., & Gibbs, R. (2002). "Are irony and metaphor understood differently?" Metaphor and Symbol, 17, 57–60.
 Gibbs, R. (2002). "A new look at literal meaning in understanding what is said and implicated". Journal of Pragmatics, 34, 457–486.
 Gibbs, R. (2002). "Identifying and appreciating poetic metaphor". Journal of Literary Semantics, 31, 101–112.
 Gibbs, R. (2002). "Marcelo Dascal and the literal meaning debates". Manuscrito, 25, 199–224.
 Gibbs, R. (2002). "Irony in the wake of tragedy". Metaphor and Symbol, 17, 145–153. 
 Gibbs, R., & Berg, E. (2002). "Mental imagery and embodied activity". Journal of Mental Imagery, 26, 1–30. 
 Gibbs, R., & Berg, E. (2002). "Finding the body in mental imagery". Journal of Mental Imagery, 26, 82–108. 
 Gibbs, R., & Franks, H. (2002). "Embodied metaphors in women's narratives about their experiences with cancer". Health Communication, 14, 139–165. 
 Gibbs, R., & Matlock, T. (2002). "Looking for metaphor in all the right ways". Theoria et Historia Scientarium, 6, 1–24. 
 Gibbs, R., & Van Orden, G. (2002). "Are emotional expressions intentional?: A self-organizational perspective". Consciousness and Emotion, 4, 1–15. 
 Gibbs, R., & Wilson, N. (2002). "Bodily action and metaphor comprehension". Style, 36, 524–540. 
 Bryant, G., & Gibbs, R. (2002). "You don't say: Figurative language and thought". Behavioral and Brain Sciences, 25, 678–679.
 Gibbs, R. (2003). "Embodiment and linguistic meaning". Brain and Language, 84, 1–15.
 Hamblin, J., & Gibbs, R. (2003). "Processing the meanings of what speakers say and implicate". Discourse Processes, 35, 59–80.
 Gibbs, R. (2003). "Imagistic filters in unconscious learning and action". Journal of Mental Imagery, 27, 166–171.
 Gibbs, R., Lima, P., & Francuzo. E. (2004). "Metaphor is grounded in embodied experience". Journal of Pragmatics, 36, 1189–1210.
 Steen, G., & Gibbs, R. (2004). "Questions about metaphor in literature". European Journal of English Studies, 8, 337–354.
 Gibbs, R. (2005). "Interpreting metaphorical sayings in the assessment of mental health". Psicopatologia Cognitiva (Cognitive Psychopathology), 3, 5–12.
 Gibbs, R. (2006). "Metaphor in cognitive linguistics: Past questions and future challenges". Revista de Documentacao de Estudos em Linguistica Teorica e Aplicada (DELTA), 22, 1–20.
 Gibbs, R. (2006). "Metaphor interpretation as embodied simulation". Mind & Language, 21, 434–458.
 Gibbs, R., & Tendahl, M. (2006). "Cognitive effort and effects in metaphor comprehension: Relevance theory and psycholinguistics". Mind & Language, 21, 379–403.
 Gibbs, R. (2006). "Introspection and cognitive linguistics: Should we trust our own intuitions?" Annual Review of Cognitive Linguistics, 4, 133–152
 Gibbs, R., Gould, J., & Andric, M. (2005–2006). "Imagining metaphorical actions: Embodied simulations make the impossible plausible". Imagination, Cognition, and Personality, 25, 221–238.
 Pragglejaz Group (2007). "MIP: A method for identifying metaphorically-used words in discourse". Metaphor and Symbol, 22, 1–40.
 Gibbs, R. (2007). "Why irony sometimes come to mind: Paradoxical effects of thought suppression". Pragmatics & Cognition, 15, 229–251.
 Gibbs, R., & Cameron, L. (2007). "Social-cognitive dynamics of metaphor performance". Cognitive Systems Research, 9, 64–75.
 Siquerra, M., & Gibbs, R. (2007). "Children's acquisition of primary metaphors: A cross-linguistic study". Organon, 43, 161–179.
 Wilson, N., & Gibbs, R. (2007). "Real and imagined body movement primes metaphor comprehension". Cognitive Science, 31, 721–731.
 Gibbs, R., & Bryant, G. (2008). "Striving for optimal relevance in answering questions". Cognition, 106, 345–369.
 Gibbs, R. (2008). "Image schemas in conceptual development: What happened to the body?" Philosophical Psychology, 21, 231–239. 
 Tendahl, M., & Gibbs, R. (2008). "Complementary perspectives on metaphor: Cognitive linguistics and relevance theory". Journal of Pragmatics, 40, 1823–1864. 
 Gibbs, R. (in press). "The strengths and weaknesses of conceptual metaphor theory: A view from cognitive science". Journal of Foreign Language. 
 Gibbs, R. (2009). "A psycholinguist's view on cognitive linguistics: An interview with Ray W. Gibbs". Annual Review of Cognitive Linguistics 7, 302–318. 
 Gibbs, R. (2010). "Stability and variation in linguistic pragmatics". Pragmatics and Society, 1, 32–49. 
 Gibbs, R. (in press). "The dynamic complexities of metaphor interpretation". Revista de Documentacao de Estudos em Linguistica Teorica e Aplicada (DELTA).
 Gibbs, R. & Macedo Pelosi, A. (in press). "Metaphor and embodied cognition". Revista de Documentacao de Estudos em Linguistica Teorica e Aplicada (DELTA).
 Gibbs, R. & Van Orden, G. (2010). "Adaptive cognition without massive modularity". Language & Cognition, 2, 147–169.
 Gibbs, R., & Perlman, M. (2010). "Language understanding is grounded in experiential simulations: A reply to Weiskopf". Studies in the History and Philosophy of Science, 41, 305–308.
 Okanski, L., & Gibbs, R. (2010). "Art is the sex of the imagination: Explaining the meanings of XYZ metaphors". Textus, 23, 699–720.
 Gibbs, R. (2011). "The individual in the scientific study of literature". Scientific Study of Literature, 1, 95–103.
 Gibbs, R. (2011). "Are deliberate metaphors really deliberate? A question of human consciousness and action". Metaphor and the Social World. 1,. 26–52.
 Gibbs, R. (2011). "Advancing the debate on deliberate metaphor". Metaphor and the Social World, 1, 67–69.
 Gibbs, R., Tendahl, M., & Okonski, L. (2011). "Inferring pragmatic messages from metaphor". Lodz Papers in Pragmatics, 7, 3–28.
 Gibbs, R. (2011). "Evaluating conceptual metaphor theory". Discourse Processes, 48, 529–562.
 Gibbs, R. (2011). "Multiple constraints on theories of metaphor". Discourse Processes, 48, 375–584.
 Gibbs, R. (2011). "Are ironic acts deliberate?" Journal of Pragmatics, 44, 104–115. 
 Gibbs, R., & Van Orden, G. (2012). "Pragmatic choice in conversation". Topics in Cognitive Science. 4, 7–20. 
 Gibbs, R., & Tendahl, M. (2011). "Coupling of metaphoric cognition and communication: A reply to Wilson". Intercultural Pragmatics, 8, 601–609. Gibbs, R. (in press). "Why do some people dislike conceptual metaphor theory? Cognitive Semiotics. 
 Gibbs, R. (2011). "Metaphoric imagery as embodied cognition". Journal of Mental Imagery, 35, 42–48. 
 Gibbs, R. (2012). "The social nature of embodied cognition: A view from the world of metaphor". Intellectica, 56, 81–98. 
 Gibbs, R. (in press). "Walking the walk while thinking about the talk: Embodied interpretation of metaphorical narratives". Journal of Psycholinguistic Research.
 Gibbs, R., & Santa Cruz, M. (in press). "Temporal unfolding of conceptual metaphoric experience". Metaphor and Symbol. 
 Gibbs, R., & Clark, N. (in press). "No need for instinct: Coordinated communication as an emergent self-organizational process". Pragmatics & Cognition. 
 Johansson-Falck, M., & Gibbs, R. (in press). "Embodied motivations for metaphoric meaning". Cognitive Linguistics.

References

Living people
21st-century American psychologists
Hampshire College alumni
University of California alumni
Fellows of the Cognitive Science Society
Year of birth missing (living people)